This is a list of hospitals in the State of Palestine.

Hospitals in Palestine

Hospitals in East Jerusalem 
 Augusta Victoria Hospital, Jerusalem: 164 beds; Al-Quds University teaching hospital
 Makassed Hospital, Jerusalem, 250 beds (Al-Quds University teaching hospital)
 Palestine Red Crescent Society Hospital , Jerusalem (Al-Quds University teaching hospital)
 St John of Jerusalem Eye Hospital Group, Jerusalem: Specialist eye hospital and ophthalmic teaching hospital
 St. Joseph's Hospital, Jerusalem

Hospitals in the West Bank 

 Al-Istishari Arab Hospital, Ramallah, 330 beds.
 Ibn Sena Specialised Hospital, Jenin

 Al-Meezan Specialized Hospital, Hebron: Al-Quds University teaching hospital
 Ahli Hospital, Hebron, West Bank: 250 beds; Al-Quds University teaching hospital
Al-Hussein Governmental Hospital, Beit Jala.
 Bethlehem Arab Society for Rehabilitation, Bethlehem: Al-Quds University teaching hospital
 Bethlehem Hospital for Psychiatric and Psychological, Bethlehem: Al-Quds University teaching hospital
Jericho Governmental Hospital, Jericho.
Martyr Dr. Thabet Thabet Government Hospital, Tulkarm.
Martyr Yasser Arafat Governmental Hospital, Salfit
Palestine Medical Complex, Ramallah: teaching hospital for the Al-Quds University Faculty of Medicine
Princess Alia Governmental Hospital, Hebron: Al-Quds University teaching hospital
 Saint John Eye Hospital Group, Hebron: Specialist eye hospital located in Hebron City
 Nablus:
 al-Ittihad Hospital
Al-Watani Medical Hospital
An-Najah National University Hospital, teaching hospital at An-Najah National University
Rafidia Surgical Hospital
 St. Lukes Hospital

Hospitals in the Gaza Strip 
 Mohammed Yousef El-Najar Hospital, Rafah
Al Ahli Arab Hospital, Gaza City 
 al-Aqsa Hospital
 al-Awda Hospital, Jabalia The emergency room was damaged by Israeli shells.
 al-Quds Hospital, Gaza.
 Al-Shifa Hospital
 Beit Hanoun Hospital, Beit Hanoun
 European Gaza Hospital
 Kamal Adwan Hospital
 Nasser Hospital
 St John of Jerusalem Eye Hospital, Gaza: Specialist eye hospital and ophthalmic teaching hospital

See also 

 Palestine Red Crescent Society
 Lists of hospitals

References

 
Hospitals
Palestine
Palestine